The Bridge is a Malaysian-Singaporean crime drama television series aired on HBO Asia, and starring Rebecca Lim and Bront Palarae. The series was inspired by the Danish-Swedish series, Broen/Bron.

Plot

The series takes place on the border of Malaysia and Singapore. Its centerpiece is the bridge on the border where a female corpse was discovered. The Malaysian Investigator is Detective Megat Jamil, the Singaporean is Detective Serena Teo. Together they investigate a series of crimes that are well prepared, skillfully executed and contain a "message" to society on the subject of social injustice.

Cast

Main
 Bront Palarae as Megat Jamil
 Rebecca Lim as Serena Teo
 Ario Bayu as Heriyanto Salim (season 2)

Recurring
 Adrian Pang as Lim Boon Teck (seasons 1–2)
  as Maria Othman (seasons 1–2)
  as Erin Tajuddin (seasons 1–2)
  as Yusof Iskandar (seasons 1–2)
  as Nabil / Adam (season 1)
 Dia Farhana as Mia (season 1)
 Syed Muhammad Husayn as Imran (season 1)
 Syed Ali Murtadha as Farid (season 1)
 Charles Roberts as Reuben Kumar (season 1)
 Erwin Dawson as Jason (season 1)
 Gavin Yap as Daniel Chong (season 1)
 Dawn Cheong as Chen Seet Yan (season 1)
 Alvin Wong as Lee Jun Weng (season 1)
 Keagan Kang as Clarence Richmond (season 1)
 Belinda Chee as Michelle Richmond (season 1)
  as Jamal Mokhtar (season 1)
 Chacko Vadaketh as Anil Raj (season 1)
  as Arif Hilmi (season 2)
 Amanda Manopo as Dian Galih (season 2)
  as Datuk Ishak Hassan (season 2)
  as Datin Roslinda Ahmad (season 2)
  as Zeckri Ishak (season 2)
  as Lyanna Mokhtar (season 2)
 Lukman Sardi as Bayu Soemarsono (season 2)
 Whulandary Herman as Indah Pangestu (season 2)
 Joseph Marco as Christian Salvador (season 2)
 Pete Teo as Sylvester "Silver" DaCosta (season 2)
  as Peter Harris (season 2)
 Chew Kin Wah as Wong Ping Chuan (season 2)
 Patrick Teoh as Mr. Ong (season 2)
  as Datuk Rahman Samad (season 2)
  as Pearl Yong (season 2)

Series overview

Season 1 (2018)

Season 2 (2020)

Awards

See also
 The Bridge (2013 TV series)
 The Tunnel (TV series)

References

External links
 

Television shows set in Malaysia
Bioterrorism in fiction
2018 Malaysian television series debuts
The Bridge (TV series)
Television shows set in Singapore
HBO Asia original programming
Viu (streaming media) original programming
2018 Singaporean television series debuts